Saint George Hare (5 July 1857 Limerick – London, 1933) was an Irish artist.

Life
He was the son of George Frederick Hare, a dentist from Ipswich, and his wife, Ella, from County Wexford. 
He was formally educated in art in Limerick School of Art, where he spent three years under the tutelage of Nicholas Brophy. In 1875, he received a scholarship and moved to London to study for seven years at the National Art Training School, South Kensington. He won a gold medal for his history painting "Death of William the Conqueror," which was exhibited at the Royal Academy in 1886. He supplemented his income from painting with teaching.

In 1891, he was a founding member of the Chelsea Arts Club. He was an elected member of both the Royal Institute of Painters in Water Colours and the Royal Institute of Oil Painters. Sir Hugh Lane included his work in the London Guildhall exhibition of Irish painters in 1906 and his work was also exhibited regularly at the Walker Gallery, Liverpool and the Manchester City Art Gallery.

He was sponsored by Sir Henry Hugh Arthur Hoare, 6th Baronet and produced several portraits of the Hoare family. His most notable works are Death of William the Conqueror (1886), The Victory of Faith (1890 or 1891), Yesterdays (1894), The Gilded Cage (1908).

Saint George Hare died in London in January 1933.

A large collection of his paintings are held by the National Trust.

References

1857 births
1933 deaths
Irish painters
Irish watercolourists
Artists from Limerick (city)